Palatka (YTB-801) was a United States Navy  named for Palatka, Florida.

Construction

The contract for Palatka was awarded 2 May 1968. She was laid down 29 November 1968 at Slidell, Louisiana, by Southern Shipbuilding Corp and launched 19 August 1969.

Operational history

Delivered 7 November 1969, Palatka was assigned to the 5th Naval District. She was later assigned to Naval Air Station Bermuda where she served until  1995.  A Large Harbor Tug, she was specially configured to berth and dock nuclear-powered submarines and aircraft carriers. She was also equipped to provide emergency rescue and other services.

Stricken from the Navy List 4 April 1995, ex-Palatka was sold 16 July 2001, by the Defense Reutilization and Marketing Service (DRMS) to Boston Towing for $437,335 and renamed Maverick.  Ex-Palatka was sold to Runner Marine Limited of Lagos, Nigeria in 2011 and renamed Alfa.

References

External links
 

 

Natick-class large harbor tugs
1969 ships
Ships built in Slidell, Louisiana